The 2009 Mississippi State Bulldogs football team represented Mississippi State University during the 2009 NCAA Division I FBS football season. Mississippi State has been a member of the Southeastern Conference (SEC) since the league's inception in 1932, and has participated in that conference's Western Division since 1992. The Bulldogs played their home games in 2009 at Davis Wade Stadium at Scott Field in Starkville, Mississippi, which has been MSU football's home stadium since 1914.

Head coach Sylvester Croom resigned at the end of the 2008 season.  The position was filled by former Florida offensive coordinator Dan Mullen, making this Mullen's first stint as a head coach. The Bulldogs finished the season 5–7 (3–5 SEC).  The NCAA rated MSU's 2009 schedule as the toughest in the country and the 2nd toughest in the past 10 years.

On November 30, 2009, Mississippi State running back Anthony Dixon was awarded the Conerly Trophy as the best college football player in the State of Mississippi. He joined previous MSU Conerly Trophy winners J.J. Johnson and Jerious Norwood.

Schedule

Schedule Source:

Depth chart

Game summaries

Statistics

Team

Scores by quarter

Offense

Rushing

Passing

Receiving

Defense

Special teams

Coaching staff
 Dan Mullen, head coach
 Mark Hudspeth, passing game coordinator
 John Hevesy, run game coordinator/offensive line coach 
 Tony Hughes, assistant head coach, defensive backs coach 
 Greg Knox, running backs coach
 Les Koenning, offensive coordinator
 Melvin Smith
 Reed Stringer
 Carl Torbush, defensive coordinator
 David Turner
 Matt Balis, head strength coach

References

Mississippi State
Mississippi State Bulldogs football seasons
Mississippi State Bulldogs football